Anatrytone is a genus of skipper butterflies in the family Hesperiidae widespread New World.

Anatrytone species listed in Tree of Life Web Project are:

The logan species-group:
 Anatrytone logan (Edwards, 1863) – Delaware skipper 
 Anatrytone mazai  (Freeman, 1969) – glowing skipper
 Anatrytone barbara (Williams & Bell, 1931)
 Anatrytone flavens (Hayward, 1940)

The mella species-group:
 Anatrytone mella (Godman, [1900]) – Mella skipper
 Anatrytone sarah Burns, 1994 – Sarah's skipper
 Anatrytone potosiensis (Freeman, 1969) – Potosi skipper
 Anatrytone perfida (Möschler, 1879) – perfida skipper

References

Natural History Museum Lepidoptera genus database

Hesperiini
Hesperiidae genera